Mount Sunflower, although not a true mountain, is the highest natural point in the U.S. state of Kansas. It is located between the communities of Kanorado and Weskan in Wallace County, less than half a mile (0.8 km) from the state border with Colorado and is close to the lowest point in Colorado.

Mount Sunflower is located on private land owned by Ed and Cindy Harold, who encourage visitors to the site. Amenities include a picnic table, a little free library, a sunflower sculpture made from railroad spikes, and a plaque on the site stating, "On this site in 1897, nothing happened." (As of 2015, however, this sign is missing, evidently stolen.) Additionally, there is a mailbox on site with a registration book inside where visitors can write their names, where they are from, and how many members are in their party.

Access is via county dirt roads to the edge of the property, then across a cattle guard and onto a private dirt road through a cattle grazing pasture to the summit.

The state of Kansas gradually increases in elevation from the east to the west. As such, Mount Sunflower, while the highest natural point in the state in terms of elevation, is virtually indistinguishable from the surrounding terrain.

See also
 
Outline of Kansas
Index of Kansas-related articles
List of U.S. states by elevation

References

External links 
 
 
 
 

Geography of Wallace County, Kansas
Tourist attractions in Wallace County, Kansas
Geography of Kansas
Highest points of U.S. states